The Guenoc Valley AVA is an American Viticultural Area in Lake County, California, United States, about  north of the town of Calistoga.  Guenoc Valley AVA was the first American Viticultural Area designation granted to an area with just a single winery.

Guenoc Valley is a small inland valley comprising an alluvial fan of Arroyo Seco and Conejo Loam series soils isolated from surrounding areas by rocky ridges. Its geographical location also affects the climate. Guenoc Valley has slightly less rainfall than the nearby Middletown area. Guenoc Valley also experiences slightly greater seasonal temperature extremes, being warmer in the summer and colder in the winter. Also, due to the surrounding ridges, fog is generally less severe than in Middletown. For these reasons, the United States Department of the Treasury Alcohol and Tobacco Tax and Trade Bureau determined that Guenoc Valley possesses geographical features which distinguish the area viticulturally.

History 
Guenoc Valley has a long tradition of viticulture and wine production.  In 1888, Victorian actress Lillie Langtry established a wine estate in the Guenoc Valley, at the southern end of the county in the 1800s. It wasn't until the late 1960s and the 1970s that farmers who wanted to diversify started planting grapes again, mostly in nearby Big Valley.

On the site of Lillie Langtry's old estate, Guenoc and Langtry Estate Vineyards was revived by the Magoon family at about the same time. The now-deceased longtime winery president Orville Magoon sold his interest in the company in 2003 and retired to San Francisco with his wife, Karen Magoon. The winery and the  it sits on is owned by Malulani Investments Ltd., a real estate group that since 1964 has been the only shareholder and stockholder of Guenoc.

Climate 
The wine appellation is defined by the rocky ridge surrounding it and is entirely contained within the boundaries of Lake County. The Guenoc vineyards sit at  elevation. These vineyards are the first in the area to be harvested, as extremely hot days are common and over-ripening is a concern. The area also has very cool nights, preserving acidity and producing rich wines with elegant structure, making it a Climate Region III.

Viticulture 
There are now  of vines surrounding the Guenoc estate. The winery works with Semillon, Sauvignon blanc and Chardonnay, as well as Malbec and Petite Sirah from the estate vineyards.  Petite Sirah is the leading red grape in the appellation, followed by Cabernet Sauvignon, Merlot, Petit Verdot, Carmenère, Cabernet Franc and Malbec. Among whites, Langtry grows Chardonnay, Sauvignon blanc, Semillon, Marsanne and Viognier. Langtry also has the distinction of having some of the oldest vines in California, as a couple of Syrah vines dating back to the 1850s still grow at the Tephra Ridge Vineyard.

References

External links 
 Langtry Farms Vineyard and Winery

Further reading
Magoon, G. S. (1976). The story of Guenoc Ranch, Lake and Napa Counties, California. Honolulu?: Magoon
Case, S. D. (1982). Join me in paradise: the history of Guenoc Valley. Middletown, Calif: Guenoc Winery.
Gerson, N. B. (1971). Because I loved him; the life and loves of Lillie Langtry. New York: Morrow.

American Viticultural Areas
American Viticultural Areas of California
Geography of Lake County, California
1981 establishments in California